Garðar Cathedral, known formally as the Cathedral of Saint Nicholas, was a Roman Catholic cathedral church located in Garðar, situated in Igaliku, Greenland. It was the first cathedral erected in the Americas, and is among the oldest surviving example of European architecture in the Americas. The cathedral was reduced to ruins and nowadays only its foundation can be seen.

History
The cathedral was founded by Greenland's first bishop Arnaldur in 1126, built of red sandstone quarried from a neighbouring hillside, in a cruciform, the only known church to be built this way in Greenland. The cathedral was dedicated to the patron saint of sailors, Saint Nicholas. Changes to the cathedral structure may have taken place during Bishop Jón Árnason's, or Jón Smyrill as he is also known, reign between 1188 and 1209. A bell tower was also built with the cathedral and windows of opaque, greenish glass. The cathedral chancel was quite narrow. There were also two chapels, one to the north and one to the south of the church, with the smaller chapel being used as a sacristy which included a path that led to the Bishop's residence. A farm and a palace for the bishop were also built, with the farm big enough to hold around 100 cows.

The cathedral wealth expanded during the 13th and 14th centuries, with bishops imposing taxes on the locals. Moreover, no one was able to fish or hunt near the lands of the cathedral without the bishop's consent. Revenues were also collected from local hot springs which were believed to have medicinal value. Nonetheless, by the late 14th century, Greenland began its years of decline. With the death of Bishop Álfur in 1378, no new bishop ever went to Greenland even though they were still appointed until the reformation.

Excavations
It was only in 1926 that excavations discovered the foundations of the cathedral and the surrounding Norse buildings. Excavations were carried out by Danish archeologist Poul Nørlund. On the site, a number of walrus skulls and narwhal were discovered, suggesting that the area near the cathedral included a pagan temple. Amongst the most famous excavations include a number of graves, notably a grave of a bishop which was buried in the north chapel of the cathedral. The skeleton discovered was that of a powerfully built middle-aged man. In his hands, a Crosier made of ashwood and decorated with walrus ivory was discovered and a gold ring on the finger. It is believed that the body belongs to one of Greenland's most famous bishops, Jón Árnason's, or Smyrill who died in 1209, as well as any other of the Norse bishops from the thirteenth-century. A bell was also excavated which may have been part of the cathedral tower.

References

Roman Catholic cathedrals in Greenland
Ruins in Greenland
Church ruins in Denmark
Kujalleq